A teetotum (or T-totum) is a form of spinning top most commonly used for gambling games. It has a polygonal body marked with letters or numbers, which indicate the result of each spin. Usage goes back to (at least) ancient Greeks and Romans, with the popular "put and take" gambling version going back to medieval times.

Description

In its earliest form the body was square (in some cases via a stick through a regular six-sided die), marked on the four sides by the letters A (Lat. aufer, take) indicating that the player takes one from the pool, D (Lat. depone, put down) when a fine has to be paid, N (Lat. nihil, nothing), and T (Lat. totum, all), when the whole pool is to be taken.

Other accounts give such letters as P, N, D (dimidium, half), and H or T or other combinations of letters. Some other combinations that could be found were NG, ZS, TA, TG, NH, ND, SL and M, which included the Latin terms Zona Salve ("save all"), Tibi Adfer ("take all"), Nihil Habeas ("nothing left"), Solve L ("save 50") and Nihil Dabis ("nothing happens").

Joseph Strutt, who was born in 1749, mentions the teetotum as used in games when he was a boy:
When I was a boy, the tee-totum had only four sides, each of them marked with a letter; a T for take all; an H for half, that is of the stake; an N for nothing; and a P for put down, that is, a stake equal to that you put down at first. Toys of this kind are now made with many sides and letters.
The teetotum was later adapted into dreidel, a Jewish game played at Hanukkah, and as the Perinola, a game played in many Latin American countries.  Some modern teetotums have six or eight sides, and are used in commercial board games in place of dice. The original 1860 version of The Game of Life used a teetotum in order to avoid the die's association with gambling.

In literature

A teetotum is mentioned by "Martinus Scriblerus", the pen name of a club of 18th-century satirical writers.

In Louisa May Alcott's Rose in Bloom, a character learning to dance says, "A fellow must have some reward for making a teetotum of himself."

The 19th-century English poet William Ernest Henley wrote the Double Ballade on the Nothingness of Things which opened with the lines:

In Lewis Carroll's fantasy Through the Looking-Glass, Alice's movements about the Old Sheep Shop provoke its proprietor (the White Queen transformed into a sheep) to ask, "Are you a child, or a teetotum?"

In Dickens' Our Mutual Friend a line of strange-looking wooden objects sticking out of the river near the Plashwater Weir Mill Lock is described as being "like huge teetotums standing at rest in the water". (Book IV, chapter 1)

In Edgar Allan Poe's 1845 dark comedy short story The System of Doctor Tarr and Professor Fether, one of the patients of the asylum is described as believing he had been converted into a "tee-totum":
"And then," said the friend who had whispered, "there was Boullard, the tee-totum. I call him the tee-totum because, in fact, he was seized with the droll but not altogether irrational crotchet, that he had been converted into a tee-totum. You would have roared with laughter to see him spin. He would turn round upon one heel by the hour, in this manner – so-

Here the friend whom he had just interrupted by a whisper, performed an exactly similar office for himself.

Put and take

In the United Kingdom, the same game with a six-sided die is called "put and take", the sides of the die are- "Put one", "Take one", "Put two", "Take two", "All put" (every player puts in) and "Take all". This is usually played for small stakes (e.g. "one" is one British penny) as amusement rather than to win money.

See also
 Long dice (esp. "Lang Larence")

References

Sources

External links

Gaming devices
Tops